Desh Prem may refer to:

Desh Prem Azad (1938–2013), Indian cricketer and coach
Desh Prem The Real Hero, Hindi release of the Tamil 2012 spy thriller Thaandavam directed by A. L. Vijay
Desh Prem Weekly, a Nepalese publication
Deshprem Divas (Netaji Jayanti)

See also
Desh Premee, 1982 Hindi film directed by Manmohan Desai
Desh Premik, 1994 Bangladeshi film directed by Kazi Hayat